Carlos Bica is a Portuguese jazz bassist.

Career
Bica studied at the Academia dos Amadores de Musica in Lisbon and the Hochschule für Musik in Würzburg. He was "Musician of the Year" in Portugal in 1998 and in 2016. For his album Matéria-Prima released in 2010, the Carlos Paredes Prize 2011 was awarded to Carlos Bica. His trio AZUL with Frank Möbus and Jim Black become his showcase as a bass player and composer. For more than twenty years Carlos Bica’s AZUL has fascinated its listeners. He has played at important jazz festivals across Europe, Canada and Asia.

He has composed for theater, dance, and film. He worked for many years with Portuguese vocalist Maria João. He has also worked with Portuguese Fado singers Carlos do Carmo, Camané, Cristina Branco, Ana Moura, José Mário Branco, and jazz musicians Ray Anderson, Kenny Wheeler, Aki Takase, Paolo Fresu, Julian Argüelles, Gebhard Ullmann, Lee Konitz, Mário Laginha, Markus Stockhausen, Alexander von Schlippenbach, Kurt Rosenwinkel, and John Zorn.

Discography

As leader
 Azul (EmArcy, 1996)
 Twist (Enja, 1998)
 Diz (Enja, 2001)
 Look What They've Done to My Song (Enja, 2003)
 Single (Bor Land, 2005)
 A Chama Do Sol (Nabel, 2006)
 Believer (Enja, 2006)
 Carlos Bica + Materia-Prima (Clean Feed, 2010)
 Things About (Clean Feed, 2011)
 Azul in Ljubljana (Clean Feed, 2018)
 I Am the Escaped One (Clean Feed, 2019)

As sideman
With Camane
 Na Linha Da Vida (EMI, 1998)
 Esta Coisa Da Alma ((EMI, 2000)
 Pelo Dia Dentro (EMI, 2001)
 Sempre De Mim (EMI, 2008)
 Ao Vivo No Coliseu (EMI, 2009)
 Do Amor E Dos Dias (EMI, 2010)

With others
 Paul Brody, Klezmer Stories (Laika, 2000)
 Paul Brody, The South Klezmer Suite (Laika, 2003)
 Pedro Caldeira Cabral, Pedro Caldeira Cabral (EMI, 1985)
 Marta Dias, Aqui (Farol Musica, 1999)
 Ulrike Haage, Die Stille Hinter Den Worten (Sans Soleil, 2008)
 Maria Joao, Conversa (Nabel, 1986)
 Maria Joao, Sol (Enja, 1991)
 Amelia Muge, Taco a Taco (Mercury, 1998)
 Jorge Palma, Norte (EMI/Virgin, 2004)
 Sam the Kid, Pratica(mente) (Edel, 2006)
 Gebhard Ullmann, Essencia (Between the Lines/EFA, 2001)

References

External links
Official website

Living people
Year of birth missing (living people)
Portuguese musicians
Portuguese male musicians
Clean Feed Records artists